Meads Peak is a peak,  high, standing  off the northwest end of Hudson Ridge in the Neptune Range, Pensacola Mountains, Antarctica. It was mapped by the United States Geological Survey from surveys and U.S. Navy air photos from 1956 to 1966, and was named by the Advisory Committee on Antarctic Names for Edward "Buzz" C. Meads, a construction driver at Ellsworth Station in the winter of 1958.

References

Mountains of Queen Elizabeth Land
Pensacola Mountains